In Earth's atmosphere, carbon dioxide is a trace gas that plays an integral part in the greenhouse effect, carbon cycle, photosynthesis and oceanic carbon cycle. It is one of several greenhouse gases in the atmosphere of Earth. The current global average concentration of CO2 in the atmosphere is 421 ppm as of May 2022. This is an increase of 50% since the start of the Industrial Revolution, up from 280 ppm during the 10,000 years prior to the mid-18th century.  The increase is due to human activity. Burning fossil fuels is the main cause of these increased CO2 concentrations and also the main cause of climate change. Other large anthropogenic sources include cement production, deforestation, and biomass burning. 

While transparent to visible light, carbon dioxide is a greenhouse gas, absorbing and emitting infrared radiation at its two infrared-active vibrational frequencies.  absorbs and emits infrared radiation at wavelengths of 4.26 μm (2,347 cm−1) (asymmetric stretching vibrational mode) and 14.99 μm (667 cm−1) (bending vibrational mode). It plays a significant role in influencing Earth's surface temperature through the greenhouse effect. Light emission from the Earth's surface is most intense in the infrared region between 200 and 2500 cm−1, as opposed to light emission from the much hotter Sun which is most intense in the visible region. Absorption of infrared light at the vibrational frequencies of atmospheric  traps energy near the surface, warming the surface and the lower atmosphere. Less energy reaches the upper atmosphere, which is therefore cooler because of this absorption.

Another direct effect is the CO2 fertilization effect. These changes cause a range of indirect effects of climate change on the physical environment, ecosystems and human societies. Carbon dioxide exerts a larger overall warming influence than all of the other greenhouse gases combined. It has an atmospheric lifetime that increases with the cumulative amount of fossil carbon extracted and burned, due to the imbalance that this activity has imposed on Earth's fast carbon cycle. This means that some fraction (a projected 20–35%) of the fossil carbon transferred thus far will persist in the atmosphere as elevated  levels for many thousands of years after these carbon transfer activities begin to subside. The carbon cycle is a biogeochemical cycle in which carbon is exchanged between the Earth's oceans, soil, rocks and the biosphere. Plants and other photoautotrophs use solar energy to produce carbohydrate from atmospheric carbon dioxide and water by photosynthesis. Almost all other organisms depend on carbohydrate derived from photosynthesis as their primary source of energy and carbon compounds. 

Reconstructed temperature records for the last 420 million years indicate that atmospheric  concentrations peaked at ~2,000 ppm during the Devonian (~400 Ma) period, and again in the Triassic (220–200 Ma) period and was four times current levels during the Jurassic period (201–145 Ma).

Current concentration and future trends

Current situation 
Since the start of the Industrial Revolution, atmospheric  concentration have been increasing, causing global warming and ocean acidification. "Parts per million" refers to the number of carbon dioxide molecules per million molecules of dry air. Previously, the value was 280 ppm during the 10,000 years up to the mid-18th century. 

It was pointed out in 2021 that "the current rates of increase of the concentration of the major greenhouse gases (carbon dioxide, methane and nitrous oxide) are unprecedented over at least the last 800,000 years".

Annual and regional fluctuations 
Atmospheric  concentrations fluctuate slightly with the seasons, falling during the Northern Hemisphere spring and summer as plants consume the gas and rising during northern autumn and winter as plants go dormant or die and decay. The level drops by about 6 or 7 ppm (about 50 Gt) from May to September during the Northern Hemisphere's growing season, and then goes up by about 8 or 9 ppm. The Northern Hemisphere dominates the annual cycle of  concentration because it has much greater land area and plant biomass than the Southern Hemisphere. Concentrations reach a peak in May as the Northern Hemisphere spring greenup begins, and decline to a minimum in October, near the end of the growing season.

Concentrations also vary on a regional basis, most strongly near the ground with much smaller variations aloft. In urban areas concentrations are generally higher and indoors they can reach 10 times background levels.

Measurements and predictions made in the recent past 

 Estimates in 2001 found that the current carbon dioxide concentration in the atmosphere may be the highest in the last 20 million years. This figure has been corrected down since then, whereby the latest estimate is now 14 million years (estimate from 2013). 
 Data from 2009 found that the global mean  concentration was rising at a rate of approximately 2 ppm/year and accelerating. 
 The daily average concentration of atmospheric  at Mauna Loa Observatory first exceeded 400 ppm on 10 May 2013 although this concentration had already been reached in the Arctic in June 2012. Data from 2013 showed that the concentration of carbon dioxide in the atmosphere is this high "for the first time in 55 years of measurement—and probably more than 3 million years of Earth history."
 As of 2018,  concentrations were measured to be 410 ppm.

Measurement techniques 

The concentrations of carbon dioxide in the atmosphere are expressed as parts per million by volume (abbreviated as ppmv or just ppm). To convert from the usual ppmv units to ppm mass, multiply by the ratio of the molar weight of CO2 to that of air, i.e. times 1.52 (44.01 divided by 28.96).

The first reproducibly accurate measurements of atmospheric CO2 were from flask sample measurements made by Dave Keeling at Caltech in the 1950s. Measurements at Mauna Loa have been ongoing since 1958. Additionally, measurements are also made at many other sites around the world. Many measurement sites are part of larger global networks. Global network data are often made publicly available.

Data networks 
There are several surface measurement (including flasks and continuous in situ) networks including NOAA/ERSL, WDCGG, and RAMCES. The NOAA/ESRL Baseline Observatory Network, and the Scripps Institution of Oceanography Network data are hosted at the CDIAC at ORNL. The World Data Centre for Greenhouse Gases (WDCGG), part of GAW, data are hosted by the JMA. The Reseau Atmospherique de Mesure des Composes an Effet de Serre database (RAMCES) is part of IPSL.

From these measurements, further products are made which integrate data from the various sources. These products also address issues such as data discontinuity and sparseness. GLOBALVIEW- is one of these products.

Ongoing ground-based total column measurements began more recently. Column measurements typically refer to an averaged column amount denoted X, rather than a surface only measurement. These measurements are made by the TCCON. These data are also hosted on the CDIAC, and made publicly available according to the data use policy.

Satellite measurements 
Space-based measurements of carbon dioxide are also a recent addition to atmospheric X measurements. SCIAMACHY aboard ESA's ENVISAT made global column X measurements from 2002 to 2012. AIRS aboard NASA's Aqua satellite makes global X measurements and was launched shortly after ENVISAT in 2012. More recent satellites have significantly improved the data density and precision of global measurements. Newer missions have higher spectral and spatial resolutions. JAXA's GOSAT was the first dedicated GHG monitoring satellite to successfully achieve orbit in 2009. NASA's OCO-2 launched in 2014 was the second. Various other satellites missions to measure atmospheric X are planned.

Analytical methods to investigate sources of CO2 

 The burning of long-buried fossil fuels releases  containing carbon of different isotopic ratios to those of living plants, enabling distinction between natural and human-caused contributions to  concentration.
 There are higher atmospheric  concentrations in the Northern Hemisphere, where most of the world's population lives (and emissions originate from), compared to the southern hemisphere. This difference has increased as anthropogenic emissions have increased.
 Atmospheric O levels are decreasing in Earth's atmosphere as it reacts with the carbon in fossil fuels to form .

Causes of the current increase

Anthropogenic CO2 emissions 

While  absorption and release is always happening as a result of natural processes, the recent rise in  levels in the atmosphere is known to be mainly due to human (anthropogenic) activity. Anthropogenic carbon emissions exceed the amount that can be taken up or balanced out by natural sinks. Thus carbon dioxide has gradually accumulated in the atmosphere and, as of May 2022, its concentration is 50% above pre-industrial levels. 

This larger disruption to the natural balance is responsible for recent growth in the atmospheric  concentration. Currently about half of the carbon dioxide released from the burning of fossil fuels is not absorbed by vegetation and the oceans and remains in the atmosphere.

Burning fossil fuels such as coal, petroleum, and natural gas is the leading cause of increased anthropogenic ; deforestation is the second major cause. In addition, land use change contributed 0.87 GtC in 2010, compared to 1.45 GtC in 1990.

The International Energy Agency estimates that the top 1% of emitters globally each had carbon footprints of over 50 tonnes of CO2 in 2021, more than 1,000 times greater than those of the bottom 1% of emitters. The global average energy-related carbon footprint is around 4.7 tonnes of CO2 per person.

Roles in various natural processes on Earth

Greenhouse effect 

Earth's natural greenhouse effect makes life as we know it possible and carbon dioxide plays a significant role in providing for the relatively high temperature on Earth. The greenhouse effect is a process by which thermal radiation from a planetary atmosphere warms the planet's surface beyond the temperature it would have in the absence of its atmosphere. Without the greenhouse effect, the Earth's average surface temperature would be about  compared to Earth's actual average surface temperature of approximately 14 °C (57.2 °F).
Water is responsible for most (about 36–70%) of the total greenhouse effect, and the role of water vapor as a greenhouse gas depends on temperature. On Earth, carbon dioxide is the most relevant, direct anthropologically influenced greenhouse gas. Carbon dioxide is often mentioned in the context of its increased influence as a greenhouse gas since the pre-industrial (1750) era. In 2013, the increase in CO2 was estimated to be responsible for 1.82 W m−2 of the 2.63 W m−2 change in radiative forcing on Earth (about 70%).

The concept of atmospheric CO2 increasing ground temperature was first published by Svante Arrhenius in 1896. The increased radiative forcing due to increased CO2 in the Earth's atmosphere is based on the physical properties of CO2 and the non-saturated absorption windows where CO2 absorbs outgoing long-wave energy.  The increased forcing drives further changes in Earth's energy balance and, over the longer term, in Earth's climate.

Carbon cycle 

Atmospheric carbon dioxide plays an integral role in the Earth's carbon cycle whereby  is removed from the atmosphere by some natural processes such as photosynthesis and deposition of carbonates, to form limestones for example, and added back to the atmosphere by other natural processes such as respiration and the acid dissolution of carbonate deposits. There are two broad carbon cycles on Earth: the fast carbon cycle and the slow carbon cycle. The fast carbon cycle refers to movements of carbon between the environment and living things in the biosphere whereas the slow carbon cycle involves the movement of carbon between the atmosphere, oceans, soil, rocks, and volcanism. Both cycles are intrinsically interconnected and atmospheric  facilitates the linkage.

Natural sources of atmospheric  include volcanic outgassing, the combustion of organic matter, wildfires and the respiration processes of living aerobic organisms. Man-made sources of  include the burning of fossil fuels for heating, power generation and transport, as well as some industrial processes such as cement making. It is also produced by various microorganisms from fermentation and cellular respiration. Plants, algae and cyanobacteria convert carbon dioxide to carbohydrates by a process called photosynthesis. They gain the energy needed for this reaction from absorption of sunlight by chlorophyll and other pigments. Oxygen, produced as a by-product of photosynthesis, is released into the atmosphere and subsequently used for respiration by heterotrophic organisms and other plants, forming a cycle with carbon.

Most sources of  emissions are natural, and are balanced to various degrees by similar  sinks. Although much  in the early atmosphere of the young Earth was produced by volcanic activity, modern volcanic activity releases only 130 to 230 megatonnes of  each year. Natural sources are more or less balanced by natural sinks, in the form of chemical and biological processes which remove  from the atmosphere.  

Overall, there is a large natural flux of atmospheric  into and out of the biosphere, both on land and in the oceans. In the pre-industrial era, each of  these fluxes were in balance to such a degree that little net  flowed between the land and ocean reservoirs of carbon, and little change resulted in the atmospheric concentration.  From the human pre-industrial era to 1940, the terrestrial biosphere represented a net source of atmospheric  (driven largely by land-use changes), but subsequently switched to a net sink with growing fossil carbon emissions. In 2012, about 57% of human-emitted , mostly from the burning of fossil carbon, was taken up by land and ocean sinks.

The ratio of the increase in atmospheric  to emitted  is known as the airborne fraction. This ratio varies in the short-term and is typically about 45% over longer (5-year) periods. Estimated carbon in global terrestrial vegetation increased from approximately 740 gigatonnes in 1910 to 780 gigatonnes in 1990.

Photosynthesis 

Carbon dioxide in the Earth's atmosphere is essential to life and to most of the planetary biosphere. The average rate of energy capture by photosynthesis globally is approximately 130 terawatts, which is about six times larger than the current power consumption of human civilization. Photosynthetic organisms also convert around 100–115 billion metric tonnes of carbon into biomass per year.

In plants, algae and cyanobacteria, photosynthesis releases oxygen. This is called oxygenic photosynthesis. Although there are some differences between oxygenic photosynthesis in plants, algae, and cyanobacteria, the overall process is quite similar in these organisms. However, there are some types of bacteria that carry out anoxygenic photosynthesis, which consumes  but does not release oxygen.

Carbon dioxide is converted into sugars in a process called carbon fixation. Carbon fixation is an endothermic redox reaction, so photosynthesis needs to supply both the source of energy to drive this process and the electrons needed to convert  into a carbohydrate. This addition of the electrons is a reduction reaction. In general outline and in effect, photosynthesis is the opposite of cellular respiration, in which glucose and other compounds are oxidized to produce  and water, and to release exothermic chemical energy to drive the organism's metabolism. However, the two processes take place through a different sequence of chemical reactions and in different cellular compartments.

Oceanic carbon cycle 

The bicarbonate is produced in reactions between rock, water, and carbon dioxide. One example is the dissolution of calcium carbonate:

 +  +  ⇌  + 2 

Reactions like this tend to buffer changes in atmospheric . Since the right side of the reaction produces an acidic compound, adding  on the left side decreases the pH of seawater, a process which has been termed ocean acidification (pH of the ocean becomes more acidic although the pH value remains in the alkaline range). Over hundreds of millions of years, this has produced huge quantities of carbonate rocks.

From 1850 until 2022, the ocean has absorbed 26 % of total anthropogenic emissions. However, the rate at which the ocean will take it up in the future is less certain. Even if equilibrium is reached, including dissolution of carbonate minerals, the increased concentration of bicarbonate and decreased or unchanged concentration of carbonate ion will give rise to a higher concentration of un-ionized carbonic acid and dissolved .

Carbon moves between the atmosphere, vegetation (dead and alive), the soil, the surface layer of the ocean, and the deep ocean. From 1850 until 2022, the ocean has absorbed 26 % of total anthropogenic emissions.

Effects of current increase

Direct effects 

Direct effects of increasing CO2 concentrations in the atmosphere include: increasing global temperatures, ocean acidification and a CO2 fertilization effect on plants and crops.

Temperature rise

Ocean acidification

CO2 fertilization effect

Other direct effects
 emissions have also led to the stratosphere contracting by 400 meters since 1980, which could affect satellite operations, GPS systems and radio communications.

Indirect effects and impacts

Approaches for reducing CO2 concentrations 

Carbon dioxide has unique long-term effects on climate change that are nearly "irreversible" for a thousand years after emissions stop (zero further emissions). The greenhouse gases methane and nitrous oxide do not persist over time in the same way as carbon dioxide. Even if human carbon dioxide emissions were to completely cease, atmospheric temperatures are not expected to decrease significantly in the short term. This is because the air temperature is determined by a balance between heating, due to greenhouse gases, and cooling due to heat transfer to the ocean. If emissions were to stop, CO2 levels and the heating effect would slowly decrease, but simultaneously the cooling due to heat transfer would diminish (because sea temperatures would get closer to the air temperature), with the result that the air temperature would decrease only slowly. Sea temperatures would continue to rise, causing thermal expansion and some sea level rise. Lowering global temperatures more rapidly would require carbon sequestration or geoengineering.

Various techniques have been proposed for removing excess carbon dioxide from the atmosphere.

Concentrations in the geologic past

Carbon dioxide is believed to have played an important effect in regulating Earth's temperature throughout its 4.7 billion year history. Early in the Earth's life, scientists have found evidence of liquid water indicating a warm world even though the Sun's output is believed to have only been 70% of what it is today. Higher carbon dioxide concentrations in the early Earth's atmosphere might help explain this faint young sun paradox. Methane, a very active greenhouse gas, may have been more prevalent as well.

Carbon dioxide concentrations have shown several cycles of variation from about 180 parts per million during the deep glaciations of the Holocene and Pleistocene to 280 parts per million during the interglacial periods. Carbon dioxide concentrations have varied widely over the Earth's 4.54 billion year history. It is believed to have been present in Earth's first atmosphere, shortly after Earth's formation. A major part of carbon dioxide emissions were soon dissolved in water and incorporated in carbonate sediments.

The production of free oxygen by cyanobacterial photosynthesis eventually led to the oxygen catastrophe that ended Earth's second atmosphere and brought about the Earth's third atmosphere (the modern atmosphere) 2.4 billion years before the present. Carbon dioxide concentrations dropped from 4,000 parts per million during the Cambrian period about 500 million years ago to as low as 180 parts per million during the Quaternary glaciation of the last two million years.

Drivers of ancient-Earth CO2 concentration 

On long timescales, atmospheric  concentration is determined by the balance among geochemical processes including organic carbon burial in sediments, silicate rock weathering, and volcanic degassing. The net effect of slight imbalances in the carbon cycle over tens to hundreds of millions of years has been to reduce atmospheric . On a timescale of billions of years, such downward trend appears bound to continue indefinitely as occasional massive historical releases of buried carbon due to volcanism will become less frequent (as earth mantle cooling and progressive exhaustion of internal radioactive heat proceed further). The rates of these processes are extremely slow; hence they are of no relevance to the atmospheric  concentration over the next hundreds or thousands of years.

Photosynthesis in the geologic past 
Over the course of Earth's geologic history  concentrations have played a role in biological evolution. The first photosynthetic organisms probably evolved early in the evolutionary history of life and most likely used reducing agents such as hydrogen or hydrogen sulfide as sources of electrons, rather than water. Cyanobacteria appeared later, and the excess oxygen they produced contributed to the oxygen catastrophe, which rendered the evolution of complex life possible. In recent geologic times, low  concentrations below 600 parts per million might have been the stimulus that favored the evolution of C4 plants which increased greatly in abundance between 7 and 5 million years ago over plants that use the less efficient C3 metabolic pathway. At current atmospheric pressures photosynthesis shuts down when atmospheric  concentrations fall below 150 ppm and 200 ppm although some microbes can extract carbon from the air at much lower concentrations.

Measuring ancient-Earth CO2 concentration 

The most direct method for measuring atmospheric carbon dioxide concentrations for periods before instrumental sampling is to measure bubbles of air (fluid or gas inclusions) trapped in the Antarctic or Greenland ice sheets. The most widely accepted of such studies come from a variety of Antarctic cores and indicate that atmospheric  concentrations were about 260–280 ppmv immediately before industrial emissions began and did not vary much from this level during the preceding 10,000 years. The longest ice core record comes from East Antarctica, where ice has been sampled to an age of 800,000 years. During this time, the atmospheric carbon dioxide concentration has varied between 180 and 210 ppm during ice ages, increasing to 280–300 ppm during warmer interglacials. The beginning of human agriculture during the current Holocene epoch may have been strongly connected to the atmospheric  increase after the last ice age ended, a fertilization effect raising plant biomass growth and reducing stomatal conductance requirements for  intake, consequently reducing transpiration water losses and increasing water usage efficiency.

Various proxy measurements have been used to attempt to determine atmospheric carbon dioxide concentrations millions of years in the past. These include boron and carbon isotope ratios in certain types of marine sediments, and the number of stomata observed on fossil plant leaves.

Phytane is a type of diterpenoid alkane. It is a breakdown product of chlorophyll and is now used to estimate ancient  levels. Phytane gives both a continuous record of  concentrations but it also can overlap a break in the  record of over 500 million years.

600 to 400 Ma 
There is evidence for high  concentrations of over 3,000 ppm between 200 and 150 million years ago, and of over 6,000 ppm between 600 and 400 million years ago.

60 to 5 Ma 
In more recent times, atmospheric  concentration continued to fall after about 60 million years ago. About 34 million years ago, the time of the Eocene–Oligocene extinction event and when the Antarctic ice sheet started to take its current form,  was about 760 ppm, and there is geochemical evidence that concentrations were less than 300 ppm by about 20 million years ago. Decreasing  concentration, with a tipping point of 600 ppm, was the primary agent forcing Antarctic glaciation. Low  concentrations may have been the stimulus that favored the evolution of C4 plants, which increased greatly in abundance between 7 and 5 million years ago.

See also
 Carbon budget
 Global temperature record

References

External links
Current global map of carbon dioxide concentrations.
Global Carbon Dioxide Circulation (NASA; 13 December 2016)
Video (03:10) – A Year in the Life of Earth's  (NASA; 17 November 2014)

Atmosphere of Earth
Carbon dioxide
Greenhouse gases

fr:Dioxyde de carbone#CO2 dans l'atmosphère terrestre